Falköpings KIK, formed 1976, is a sports club in Falköping, Sweden. The women's soccer professional played the 2007 season in the Swedish top division, Damallsvenskan.

References

External links
 Falköpings KIK - Official website 

Association football clubs established in 1976
Sports teams in Sweden
1976 establishments in Sweden